Riverview Park,  is a park located on the Chippewa River in Eau Claire, Wisconsin, on the north side of the city. The park also incorporates an island in the Chippewa River.

Facilities
Riverview Park offers three pavilions for picnics and parties, all of which offer grilling facilities, seating accommodations and access to electricity;  of track for walking or bicycling; and a boat landing.

The park is open year-round, and also offers playground and public bathrooms.  Cross-country skiing is allowed in winter. The picnic shelter and bathroom facilities ere built in 1971. 

In 2020 the Eau Claire City Council announced $2M worth of improvements to the park.

References

External links
Pavilion Information 

Eau Claire, Wisconsin